Billy Caldwell,  baptized Thomas Caldwell (March 17, 1782 – September 28, 1841), known also as Sauganash ([one who speaks] English), was a British-Potawatomi fur trader who was commissioned captain in the  Indian Department of Canada during the War of 1812. He moved to the United States in 1818 and settled there. In 1829 and 1833 he negotiated treaties on behalf of the United Nations of Chippewa, Ottawa and Potawatomi with the United States, and became a leader of a Potawatomi band at Trader's Point (Iowa Territory). He worked to gain the boundary long promised by the British between white settlers and Indians, but never achieved it.

Born in a Mohawk refugee camp near Fort Niagara, Billy was the son of a Mohawk mother (Caldwell Oral Family History - Ontario) and William Caldwell, a Scots-Irish immigrant to North America and a Loyalist British officer during the American Revolutionary War. He became multilingual, learning Potawatomi, English, and French.

After moving to the United States in 1818, Caldwell became a fur trader and learned the Potawatomi language, an Algonquian language; he negotiated with numerous tribes in the Lake Michigan area. He gained their respect and also acted as a translator and negotiator between the government and American Indians. In 1829, Caldwell represented the Chippewa, Ottawa and Potawatomi peoples of the United Nations Tribes in negotiating the Second Treaty of Prairie du Chien with the United States. For his work, the US granted him a 1600-acre tract, known as the Caldwell Reserve, along the Chicago River. Eighty acres is included within the Cook County Forest Preserve.

Together with Alexander Robinson, Caldwell also negotiated the 1833 Treaty of Chicago for the United Nations Tribes. The US had appointed the two mixed-race men as chiefs in 1829 to fill vacant positions, to encourage the United Nations Tribes to sign the cessions. The treaty led to the final removal of American Indians from that region, to west of the Mississippi River. In 1835, Caldwell migrated with his people from the Chicago region west to Platte County, Missouri.

As a result of the Platte Purchase in 1836, Caldwell and his band were removed from Missouri to Iowa Territory, to the area of Trader's Point (Pointe aux Poules) on the east bank of the Missouri River. While living at Trader's Point, Caldwell led a band of approximately 2000 Potawatomi. Their settlement became known as Camp Caldwell. In 1841 Caldwell died; scholars believe it may have been because of cholera.

Early life and education
Soon after the American Revolutionary War, Billy Caldwell, was born in 1782 (as documented through two autobiographical letters) in a Mohawk refugee camp near Fort Niagara to a Mohawk woman.  His father was William Caldwell, a Scots-Irish immigrant who came to North America in 1773 and served as a Loyalist soldier in the war. Living first in Virginia, in 1774 his father had fought as an officer with Lord Dunmore and was wounded. After recovering, he went to Fort Niagara in New York, where he fought with the partisan Butler's Rangers against Patriot colonists in New York and Pennsylvania.

After the war, Caldwell abandoned Billy and his mother, moving to the Detroit area. He resettled as a Loyalist in Upper Canada, where he was granted land by the British Crown. In addition to clearing land for his own farm, he helped develop the town of Amherstburg, in present-day Ontario.

In 1783, the senior Caldwell married Suzanne Baby (daughter of Jacques Baby dit Dupéron), of French-Canadian descent. They eventually had eight children together. In 1789, when Billy was seven, his father took the boy to live with him and his Canadian wife, who wanted to rear him in the Catholic faith. Billy was given a basic Anglo-Canadian education and became Catholic. Living with his father's family, Billy learned to speak both English and French, after having grown up learning the Iroquoian Mohawk. Although Billy worked on his father's farm as he was growing up, he wanted a different life.

Career
In 1797 at the age of 17, Billy Caldwell entered United States (US) territory for the first time, to learn the fur trade business (he traded for much of his life). He kept his British Canadian loyalties and learned Potowatomi, an Algonquian language, for dealing with the several tribes of that language family near Lake Michigan.

Billy Caldwell Jr. was considered the left hand of the Great Leader Tecumseh, One of North America's greatest European resistance movements.

In 1812, after the Battle of Fort Dearborn, Caldwell at age 32 returned to Canada to enlist in the British service; he looked for his father's help to gain a commission. The senior Caldwell by then was a Lieutenant Colonel and had gained commissions for his sons by Suzanne. The regular army did not accept Billy Caldwell, but he was commissioned as a captain in the Indian Department. By then he had become influential among the Ojibwa, Ottawa and Potawatomi, Algonquian-speaking tribes inhabiting the area around Lake Michigan. Severely wounded in his first combat action, Caldwell Jr. recovered and participated in several more battles along the northern frontier. He was disgusted that the British abandoned their First Nations allies at the Battle of the Thames, when General Proctor made an early retreat before the US forces. By account of natives at the battle, Caldwell was one of the last to see Tecumseh alive, walking away after the battle mortally wounded in the chest. In addition, through this period Caldwell had worked with the British in the hope they would deliver the long-promised boundary between European and First Nations settlement, but each war ended with their ceding more land to the Americans.

In 1814, the Canadians appointed the senior Caldwell as Superintendent of Indians for the Western District, a position for which the younger Caldwell had competed as well. He was appointed second to his father. In 1815 Amherstburg, Ontario's Commandant, Reginald James, suspended Caldwell Sr. because of problems in supplying the Indians; he appointed Billy Caldwell as Superintendent. The Indian Department quickly found that he could not manage the work and "eased him out" the following year, in 1816.

The younger Caldwell inherited a plot of land in early 1818 after his father's death, but decided to return to the US. He settled in the Fort Dearborn area (now Chicago); he had long been recruited by Americans because of his influence with the local tribes. He worked hard to gain the Americans' trust. At the same time he continued to work with a local fur trade firm and became active with the tribes in the area.

He became more politically active and in 1825, Caldwell sought an appointment to become a justice of the peace. In August 1826, Caldwell served as a judge in Peoria County, Illinois's first election. Also in 1826, he was recommended to the Governor of Illinois to hold the Justice of the Peace position for Peoria County. That year, he became an appraiser for the estate of John Crafts, a local trader who died during the year of 1825. In 1827, Caldwell worked for the United States to secure information related to a possible Winnebago uprising.

In 1829, Caldwell became one of several chiefs to represent the United Nations of the Chippewa, Ottawa, and Potawatomi in negotiations with the United States in the Second Treaty of Prairie du Chien. The US was working on Indian Removal, the process that would be authorized by Congress in 1830. At the same time, their agents were also negotiating with the Winnebago for cessions and removal.

"Through his involvement in the process, he became recognized as a chief of the United Nations," and was so introduced by their spokesmen. Also negotiating as a chief was Alexander Robinson (also known as Chechepinquay or The Squinter), a mixed-race Potawatomi who was Caldwell's long-time friend. He later said that Dr. Wolcott, the US Indian Agent to the United Nations, arranged for both Robinson and Caldwell to be selected as chiefs to fill two vacancies. It was an example of US intervention into tribes' processes for identifying their own leaders. Wolcott wanted to have chiefs who would favor the treaty, fearing that unless all the chiefs' positions filled, the United Nations would not sign. The US granted both Robinson and Caldwell large plots of land under the treaty for their parts in influencing the other chiefs to sign the land cession.

Caldwell was given 1600 acres on the Chicago River. In 1833, he helped found the first Catholic church in Chicago, Saint Mary of the Assumption. It was located at what is now Lake Street west of State Street.

In 1833, together with Robinson, Caldwell was one of the chiefs representing the United Nations of the three tribes in negotiating the Treaty of Chicago. By this, the Potawatomi ceded the "last of their Illinois and Wisconsin lands and their last reservations in Michigan." Caldwell and his band migrated west in 1835, first settling in Missouri west of the Mississippi River. The treaty provided for a $10,000 payment each to Caldwell and Robinson, and a $400 lifetime annuity for Caldwell, with $300 annually for Robinson. Before the US Senate ratified the treaty in 1835, it reduced the lump-sum payments to the men to $5000 each, but left their annuities intact. Robinson and some other Métis remained in Illinois on their private tracts of land, but most of the United Nations Tribes removed to Missouri and then to Iowa.

Caldwell Reserve
The US had awarded Caldwell's Reserve, 1600 acres on the Chicago River, to Sauganash in 1829 as a result of his services in negotiating the Prairie du Chien treaty. In 1833, likely due to the declining fur trade and development opportunities, Caldwell began selling off his land by contracting with the land speculator Arthur Bronson from New York. According to his land patent, to be legally binding, each deed had to have a president's endorsed signature upon it. All unsold parcels were to be reserved for Caldwell's heirs forever, in trust with the US Bureau of Indian Affairs. The land patent was not completed until 1839, and the deeds did not gain a president's signature until 1841, after Caldwell and his band had left the area for the West.

In all, six land sales took place from Caldwell's Reserve. These land transactions included: 80 acres to George W. Dole and Richard Hamilton in June 1833 for $100; 160 acres to Richard Nicolas, Sarah Amantus, Eleanor Hamilton, and infant heirs of Richard Jo and Diana W. Hamilton in July 1833 for $200; 160 acres to Philo Carpenter in July 1833 for $200; 720 acres to Arthur Bronson in 1833 for $900; 160 acres to Captain Seth Johnson in November 1833 for $200; 80 and 160 acres, respectively, to Julius B. Kingsbury in November 1834 for $300. To date, the Northern 80 acres of Caldwell's Reserve were never legally conveyed for sale with a president's signature of approval. They are included within the Cook County Forest Preserve and Wildwood community of Chicago.

Marriage and family
Caldwell married La Natte about 1804, who died after the birth of their first child, Alexander. She was the niece of the powerful Potowatomi chief, Mad Sturgeon.  Alexander died in 1832 in his twenties from alcoholism.

Caldwell married again, but his second wife also died within a year after the birth of their first child.

Before leaving the Chicago area, Caldwell married a third time, on November 18, 1834. His bride was Saqua (also called Masaqua) LeGrand, a Métis woman of Potawatomi and French descent. They had a daughter and son born after they migrated west. Only the son, Pe-y-mo, survived to adulthood. Later in the nineteenth century, Pe-y-mo entered the historical records when trying to sell the last 80 acres of Caldwell's Reserve in Chicago.

Indian removal

In 1835, Caldwell and his band of Potawatomi left the State of Illinois and relocated in Platte County, Missouri.

In 1836, as a result of the Platte Purchase, Caldwell and his band were removed from this reservation to Trader's Point on the east bank of the Missouri River in the Iowa Territory. The Potawatomi band of an estimated 2000 individuals settled in a main village called "Caldwell's Camp", located where the later city of Council Bluffs, Iowa developed. (This was on the eastern bank of the river, opposite the present-day city of Omaha, Nebraska.)

From 1838 to 1839, Caldwell and his people were ministered to by the notable Belgian Jesuit missionary Pierre-Jean De Smet, based in St. Louis, Missouri. The Jesuit priest was appalled at the violence and desperation that overtook the Potawatomi in their new home, in large part due to the whiskey trade. After De Smet returned to St. Louis, the Catholic mission was abandoned by 1841.
	 	
Caldwell died on September 28, 1841; scholars believe it may have been from cholera. His wife Masaqua died in the winter of 1843. Together they had one surviving son, Pe-y-mo. Pe-y-mo married and had his own family, and they lived for some time with the Kickapoo in Kansas. In the late nineteenth century, he became a naturalized citizen of the United States.

Legacy and honors
The Sauganash Hotel in Chicago in 1831 was named after Caldwell.
He was awarded a 1600-acre reserve on the Chicago River, including the confluence of the three tributaries of the North Branch of the Chicago River, which he started selling off in 1833. Eighty acres of the reserve were never sold, and this portion is now part of the Cook County Forest Preserve, including the Billy Caldwell Golf Course, which borders on Caldwell Avenue (also named after him).
Another part of Billy Caldwell's 1600-acre reserve is now the Sauganash residential neighborhood on Chicago's far north side
His son Pe-y-mo married and had a family.
There is a Sauganash Golf Club in Three Rivers, MI., named after him.
 Map of Chicago 1980.

References

1782 births
1841 deaths
British Indian Department
American fur traders
American Mohawk people
Council Bluffs, Iowa
History of Chicago
Native American leaders
Potawatomi people
Baby family (Canada)